Downey is an unincorporated community in Cedar County, Iowa.

Demographics

History
Downey was established in 1856, the spring after the Chicago, Rock Island and Pacific Railroad was built through it, though the area had first been settled in 1836. Downey is named for its founder, Hugh D. Downey.  Downey's population was 100 in 1902, and 105 in 1925.

References

Unincorporated communities in Cedar County, Iowa
Unincorporated communities in Iowa
1856 establishments in Iowa